Why Do They Call It Love When They Mean Sex? is a 1993 Spanish film directed by Manuel Gómez Pereira. Rosa Maria Sardà won the 1994 Goya Award for Best Supporting Actress for her performance as Sole.

Cast
Verónica Forqué - Gloria
Jorge Sanz - Manu
Rosa Maria Sardà - Sole
Fernando Guillén - Enrique

External links

1993 films
1990s Spanish-language films
Spanish comedy films
1990s Spanish films